Ælfric was Ealdorman of Hampshire from  to 1016.

Ælfric succeeded ealdorman Æthelmær to the county of Hampshire and possibly Wiltshire in about 982. Ælfric was among the leading advisers of King Æthelred and was described by the Anglo-Saxon Chronicle as 'one of those in whom the king trusted most'; this is perhaps seen in 991 when, along with Æthelweard and Sigeric, he advised the king to pay the Danes for peace, which he did. Though one of the king's most trusted men, Ælfric in 992 defected to a Danish fleet that he was supposed to attack. Though his defecting ship was captured, he escaped. However, his family suffered for this act, as Æthelred had his son Ælfgar blinded the year after (993). Ælfric was at some point reconciled with Æthelred, since the Anglo-Saxon Chronicle has him fighting for the English in 1016, but in 1003 he supposedly pretended to be sick in order to avoid leading an army from Wiltshire and Hampshire against Sweyn Forkbeard, who was allowed to pillage Wilton. Ælfric died in the Battle of Assandun on 18 October 1016 fighting for Edmund Ironside.

In a charter from 993 Ælfric was censured for buying the abbacy of Abingdon for his brother Eadwine and encouraging the king to alienate the abbey's lands to laymen, among whom his son Ælfgar should probably be numbered.

References

External links
 

Anglo-Saxon ealdormen
Anglo-Saxon warriors
History of Hampshire
1016 deaths
Year of birth unknown
Anglo-Saxons killed in battle